Augustus Freeman Hawkins (August 31, 1907 – November 10, 2007) was an American politician of the Democratic Party who served in the California State Assembly from 1935 to 1963 and the U.S. House Of Representatives from 1963 to 1991. Over the course of his career, Hawkins authored more than 300 state and federal laws, the most famous of which are Title VII of the Civil Rights Act of 1964 and the 1978 Humphrey-Hawkins Full Employment Act. He was known as the "silent warrior" for his commitment to education and ending unemployment.

Early and personal life 
Hawkins was born in Shreveport, Louisiana, the youngest of five children, to Nyanza Hawkins and Hattie Freeman. In 1918, the family moved to Los Angeles. Hawkins graduated from Jefferson High School in 1926, and received a bachelor's degree in economics from the University of California, Los Angeles in 1931. After graduation, he planned to study civil engineering, but the financial constraints of the Great Depression made this impossible. This contributed towards his interest in politics, and his lifelong devotion to education. After graduating, Hawkins operated a real estate company with his brother and studied government. While serving in the California State Assembly, Hawkins married Pegga Adeline Smith on August 28, 1945. Smith died in 1966, and Hawkins later married Elsie Taylor in 1977. After retiring from Congress, he stayed in the Washington area because his wife preferred it, living there until his death, two months after hers.

An African American of mixed-race ancestry, Hawkins was very fair-skinned and reportedly resembled his English grandfather. Throughout his life, he was often assumed to be of solely white ancestry, though he refused to pass as white.

Political career

State Assembly 
Augustus Hawkins served in California at a time when black representation was so limited that "the black strategy for gaining political power was to exercise influence within the Democratic Party through voting for, and lobbying, white politicians." Aside from Hawkins, "Los Angeles blacks had no other political representative in city, county, state, or federal government."

Hawkins was part of a more general shift by African Americans away from the Republican and towards the Democratic Party. Unlike the majority of African Americans, he supported Franklin D. Roosevelt's campaign for president in 1932. Hawkins favored measures such as the New Deal, which was wildly popular in the United States at large and the African American community in particular. Roosevelt would go on to be the first Democratic president to win the black vote, in 1936. In 1934, Hawkins supported the more controversial 1934 California gubernatorial election of Upton Sinclair, a socialist. Although Sinclair lost, Hawkins defeated Republican Frederick Madison Roberts, the great-grandson of Sally Hemings and President Thomas Jefferson and the first African American in the California State Assembly. Hawkins would serve as a Democratic member of the Assembly from 1935 until 1963, by the time of his departure being the most senior member, like Roberts before him.

Hawkins' district was primarily Latino American and African American. During his time in the Assembly, he introduced legislation including "a fair housing act, a fair employment practices act, low-cost housing and disability insurance legislation, and workers’ compensation provisions for domestic workers." Along with education, fair practices in employment and housing became Hawkins' major causes. He received little support at the time for these measures from the Democratic Party, however. Nevertheless, he was able to get some measures passed, including his fair housing law, which prohibited discrimination by any builders who received federal funds. Hawkins was also a delegate to the National Conventions of 1940, 1944 and 1960 as well as an electoral college presidential elector from California in 1944. In 1958, Hawkins sought to be Speaker of the California State Assembly, which was the second most powerful position in the state, after the Governor of California. Hawkins lost to Ralph M. Brown, but was made chairman of the powerful rules committee. Had Hawkins succeeded, he would have been the first African American Speaker in Californian history. Willie Brown would achieve this feat in 1980. In 1962, Hawkins won a newly created majority-black congressional district encompassing central Los Angeles With an endorsement from John F. Kennedy, Hawkins easily won the primary and the general election. After the election, Hawkins remarked, “It's like shifting gears—from the oldest man in the Assembly in years of service to a freshman in Congress.”

U.S. Congress 
From 1963 to 1991, Hawkins represented California's 21st District (1963–1975), and the 29th District (1975–1991), covering southern Los Angeles County, in Congress. Hawkins was consistently elected with over 80% of the vote in his Democratic-friendly district. He was the first black representative elected west of the Mississippi River.

Hawkins was a strong supporter of President Lyndon B. Johnson's Great Society. Early in his congressional career, he authored legislation including Title VII of the Civil Rights Act of 1964 that established the Equal Employment Opportunity Commission. Hawkins was a strong supporter of civil rights, and toured the South in 1964 to advocate for African-American voter registration.

Five days after the Voting Rights Act of 1965 was signed into law, the Watts Riots occurred in Hawkins' district. It was the first of many race riots in the 1960s. Hawkins urged his colleagues in Congress to increase antipoverty funds, but did not condone the violence. Due to his light skin and heightened racial tensions, Hawkins had to be careful when he visited his district shortly after the riots. The riots stalled the Great Society, particularly over the fair housing; blacks who benefited from Great Society laws were blamed as being harmful to the "law and order" of America, particularly if they were allowed to live next to whites. Fair housing was still an unpopular issue in America: Democratic Senate nominee Pierre Salinger lost to Republican George Murphy in California over the issue, marking the only Republican pickup amid Lyndon Johnson's crushing presidential victory over anti-civil rights Barry Goldwater in 1964. Open housing reform seemed next on the Great Society list after the Voting Rights Act was signed, but the Watts Riot put it on hold. It was not passed until after the 1968 assassination of Martin Luther King Jr.

On the Vietnam War, Hawkins initially agreed with President Johnson. In 1964, both insisted that the war undermined the Great Society and that the United States could not "impose our way of life on other people." When it became clear that South Vietnam was not stable enough to survive without American backing, Hawkins increased his criticism of the war. After touring South Vietnam June 1970, Hawkins and fellow Democratic Representative William Anderson drafted a House Resolution urging Congress to "condemn the cruel and inhumane treatment" of prisoners in South Vietnam. Anderson and Hawkins had visited South Vietnam with nine other congressmen, but they were the only two to visit a civilian South Vietnamese prison on Con Son Island, which they described as being akin to “tiger cages.” The two Representatives also pressured President Nixon to send an independent task force to investigate the prison and “prevent further degradation and death.”

Hawkins was a founding member of the Congressional Black Caucus, and served as vice chairman during its first term (1971–1973). Hawkins did not play a significant role in the CBC, as he preferred to focus on legislation rather than use Congress as a bully pulpit like other African Americans such as Adam Clayton Powell, Jr., Bill Clay, and Ron Dellums; Hawkins argued that there needed to be “clearer thinking and fewer exhibitionists in the civil rights movement.” During this time, Hawkins succeeded in restoring honorable discharges to the 170 black soldiers of the 25th Infantry Regiment who had been falsely accused of a public disturbance in Brownsville, Texas, in 1906, and removed from the Army. Unlike other CBC members, he sought cooperation from organized labor and white ethnics in order to make his agenda more likely to pass into law. In 1980, Hawkins criticized the CBC as "85 percent social and 15 percent business."

Aside from Title VII of the Civil Rights Act, laws that Hawkins was instrumental in passing include: the 1974 Juvenile Justice and Delinquency Prevention Act, a law which provides certain protections to young criminal offenders; the 1978 Comprehensive Employment and Training Act; and the 1978 Pregnancy Disability Act, which aimed to prevent discrimination against women on the basis of pregnancy and of which Hawkins said, “we have the opportunity to ensure that genuine equality in the American labor force is more than an illusion and that pregnancy will no longer be the basis of unfavorable treatment of working women." Hawkins is known best of all for the 1978 Humphrey-Hawkins Full Employment Act, which Hawkins sponsored in 1977 alongside the legendary Senator Hubert Humphrey of Minnesota. The Bill gave the U.S. government the goal to provide full employment; it also ordered that the Chairman of the Federal Reserve Board must provide Congress with testimony on the state of the economy. However, by the time it made to President Jimmy Carter's desk, "the legislation was clearly symbolic." Hawkins later authored landmark legislation such as the Job Training Partnership Act and the 1988 School Improvement Act. He became chair of the House Education and Labor Committee in 1984.

Hawkins was frustrated from the relative lack of success that he achieved during the 1980s presidencies of Ronald Reagan and George H. W. Bush. They were the most conservative presidents since the 1920s, and members of his own party were moving to the right and viewed Hawkins's old-school New Dealer stance as outdated. His greatest setback was George H. W. Bush's veto of the Civil Rights Act of 1990, sometimes called the Hawkins-Kennedy Civil Rights Act. It would have reversed six Supreme Court decisions made in the previous year that had shifted the burden of proof of discriminating hiring practices of minorities or women from the employer to the employee. It remains the only successful veto of a civil rights act in United States history. Hawkins retired in 1991. Bush would sign a less expansive bill, the Civil Rights Act of 1991, after Hawkins's retirement.

Later life 
Hawkins retired in 1991 to his Los Angeles home, having never lost an election in 58 years as an elected official. He lived in Washington, D.C., for the remainder of his life. Until his death at the age of 100, he was the oldest living person to have served in Congress. He was the eighth person to have served in Congress that reached the age of 100. Hawkins's death left the former Alabama Republican Representative Arthur Glenn Andrews (1909–2008) as the oldest living former House member.

Legacy 
The Augustus F. Hawkins Nature Park was built in 2000 in a highly urbanized area of south Los Angeles. The cost was $4.5 million and was financed largely by city, county, and state bond measures. The park encompasses 8.5 acres and features the Evan Frankel Discovery Center, which includes natural history and environmental interpretive displays. The Augustus F. Hawkins Centers of Excellence Program is a federal grants program supporting diversification of the U.S. teaching force. 

Augustus F. Hawkins High School in Los Angeles, opened in 2012, is named in his honor.

See also
List of African-American United States representatives

References

External links

Obituary from the Los Angeles Times
Obituary from The Baltimore Sun

Join California Augustus F. "Gus" Hawkins

|-

|-

|-

|-

|-

1907 births
2007 deaths
20th-century American politicians
African-American centenarians
African-American members of the United States House of Representatives
African-American state legislators in California
American centenarians
Democratic Party members of the California State Assembly
Democratic Party members of the United States House of Representatives from California
Men centenarians
People from South Los Angeles
Politicians from Los Angeles
Politicians from Shreveport, Louisiana
University of California, Los Angeles alumni
20th-century African-American politicians
21st-century African-American people
African-American men in politics